Abaratha ransonnetii, commonly known as the golden angle, is a butterfly belonging to the family Hesperiidae. It was first described by Baron Cajetan von Felder in 1868.

Subspecies
The following subspecies are reconised:

 Abaratha ransonnetii potiphera Hewitson, 1873 (India)
 Abaratha ransonnetii ransonnetii (Sri Lanka)

Range
It occurs in India (Gujarat, Jharkhand, Odisha and southwards to Kerala) and Sri Lanka.

Description

In 1891, Edward Yerbury Watson gave this detailed description:

Gallery

References

External links

Tagiadini
Butterflies of Asia
Butterflies described in 1868
Butterflies of Sri Lanka
Taxa named by Baron Cajetan von Felder